Southwark Playhouse is a theatre in London, located between Borough and Elephant and Castle tube stations.

History

The Southwark Playhouse Theatre Company was founded in 1993 by Juliet Alderdice and Tom Wilson. They identified the need for a high quality accessible theatre which would also act as a major resource for the community. They leased a disused workshop in a then comparatively neglected part of Southwark and turned it into a flexible theatre space.

The theatre quickly put down strong roots in Southwark, developing an innovative, free-at-source education programme. It has worked closely with teachers, Southwark Borough Council, businesses and government agencies to improve educational achievement and raise aspirations. This programme is in great demand and attracts substantial funding each year.

Over the next fifteen years the theatre established itself as one of London's leading studio theatres, presenting high quality work by new and emerging theatre practitioners. Under successive artistic directors, Mehmet Ergen (now Artistic Director of the Arcola Theatre), Erica Whyman (subsequently Artistic Director of the Northern Stage Company and deputy Artistic Director of the Royal Shakespeare Company), Thea Sharrock and Gareth Machin (now Artistic Director of Salisbury Playhouse), it has become an indispensable part of small-scale fringe theatre in London. Its venue hire rates remain among the lowest and therefore the most competitive in London theatre, providing the opportunity to host the best of the emerging companies based in or visiting the capital.

Southwark Playhouse has moved venues twice in its 20-year history. After leaving its original home in Southwark Bridge Road in 2006, the theatre operated in vaults beneath platform one of London Bridge railway station, accessed from Tooley Street, from 2007 until early 2013. Since early 2013 the theatre has been based at 77-85 Newington Causeway, and plans to move to a new permanent venue on Newington Butts by 2021, as well as a smaller satellite venue on the site of its earlier London Bridge location.

Plans
In July 2012 it was announced that, due to the redevelopment of London Bridge Station, Southwark Playhouse would not be able to keep its home underneath the arches of the station. After a high-profile public campaign backed by Stephen Fry and Andy Serkis, a space was secured in the new station complex as part of a Section 106 agreement with Network Rail which will allow the theatre to return to its London Bridge premises in 2021.

Since 2013 Southwark Playhouse has been based at 77-85 Newington Causeway, in a 3-floor warehouse between Borough and Elephant and Castle tube stations. The temporary theatre,  opened in May 2013, houses two performance spaces: a 240-seat 'Main House' and a 120-seat 'Studio'. There is also a rehearsal space and a bar/cafe area.

The original plan for the theatre was to return to its Tooley Street location once the London Bridge redevelopment was completed in 2018. As of October 2020 this has not yet happened and the temporary home on Newington Causeway remains, but a new permanent 300-seat venue on Newington Butts is currently planned to be opened by 2021, along with a secondary satellite venue at Tooley Street with two spaces holding 200 and 150 seats. Funding is still in progress for these new sites to be opened.

Controversies 
In January 2019, a production of All in a Row sparked controversy over the way that an autistic person was being represented in puppet form.

References

External links
Southwark Playhouse's website

Theatres in the London Borough of Southwark
Arts organizations established in 1993
1993 establishments in England